General elections were held in Peru on 10 June 1945 to elect the President and both houses of Congress. In the presidential elections the result was a victory for José Luis Bustamante y Rivero of the National Democratic Front (FDN), who received 66.9% of the vote. The FDN also emerged as the largest party in both houses of Congress, winning 35 of the 49 seats in the Senate and 73 of the 153 seats in the Chamber of Deputies.

Results

President

Senate

Chamber of Deputies

References

General
Elections in Peru
Peru
Presidential elections in Peru
Election and referendum articles with incomplete results